Ikenna Nwankwo (born December 27, 1973) is a Nigerian-American former professional basketball player. From Houston, Texas, he played college basketball with the UCLA Bruins, winning a national championship in 1995.

College career
Nwankwo played with the UCLA Bruins, and won a national championship on their 1994–95 team. In his second year as a reserve behind center George Zidek, he played in a career-high 23 games, averaging 2.7 points and 1.6 rebounds.  After Zidek graduated, Nwankwo anticipated  a larger role in 1995–96; however, freshman Jelani McCoy became the starting center instead. Seeking more playing time, Nwankwo transferred to Long Beach State in January 1996.

Professional career
Nwankwo began his professional career in Venezuela with the Cocodrilos de Caracas. After a very successful stint where he was the league MVP he then moved to Puerto Rico where he was an MVP candidate in Puerto Rico, with Quebradillas Pirates of the Baloncesto Superior Nacional (BSN) from 1998-1999. In 1998 Nwankwo also played his first season in Turkey where he would play for the next two seasons. He played with Tuborg where he led the league in rebounds at 10. 1 per game. He returned to Tuborg the following year until a knee injury cut his season short. He then signed in Poland with Prokom Trefl Sopot. Nwankwo signed with the Miami Heat of the NBA in 2000, the following year he signed with the Houston Rockets. From 2001-2003, Nwankwo played for several European clubs including MBC Dynamo Moscow of the Russian Superleague. In 2003 Nwankwo joined the Huntsville Flight (now Albuquerque Thunderbirds) of the National Basketball Development League. 2004 saw Nwankwo return to Turkey, where he played with Darüşşafaka S.K. of the Turkish Basketball League (TBL). Since 2005, Nwankwo has played in the Portuguese Basketball League (LCB) (2005 with CAB Madeira and since 2006 with CA Queluz.

NBA teams
Nwankwo signed to play with an NBA squad every year from 2000-2004 except 2003, with the Miami Heat (2000), Houston Rockets (2001), Cleveland Cavaliers (2002) and the Los Angeles Lakers (2004) seasons.

International career
Although born in the United States, Nwankwo has represented the land of his ancestry, Nigeria, in international competition. He played for Nigeria at the FIBA Africa Championship 2003 and 2006 FIBA World Championship.

Coaching career 
After his playing career ended, Nwankwo started a basketball academy for kids in Bangkok in 2010, which he later launched in Hong Kong as well.

Personal
His name "Ikenna" means "The Father's Strength" in Igbo

References

External links
 TBLStat.net Profile

1973 births
Living people
American expatriate basketball people in the Netherlands
American expatriate basketball people in Poland
American expatriate basketball people in Portugal
American expatriate basketball people in Russia
American expatriate basketball people in Spain
American expatriate basketball people in Thailand
American expatriate basketball people in Turkey
American expatriate basketball people in Uruguay
American expatriate basketball people in Venezuela
American men's basketball players
American sportspeople of Nigerian descent
Asseco Gdynia players
Basketball players from Houston
BC Dynamo Moscow players
C.A. Queluz players
CAB Madeira players
Centers (basketball)
Club Malvín basketball players
Club Ourense Baloncesto players
Cocodrilos de Caracas players
Darüşşafaka Basketbol players
Dutch Basketball League players
Huntsville Flight players
Long Beach State Beach men's basketball players
Marinos B.B.C. players
Nigerian expatriate basketball people in Poland
Nigerian expatriate basketball people in Russia
Nigerian expatriate basketball people in Spain
Nigerian expatriate basketball people in Turkey
Nigerian men's basketball players
Piratas de Quebradillas players
Power forwards (basketball)
Feyenoord Basketball players
Sioux Falls Skyforce players
Tuborg Pilsener basketball players
UCLA Bruins men's basketball players
2006 FIBA World Championship players